City Hero is a 1985 Hong Kong action comedy film directed by Dennis Yu and starring Dean Shek, Mark Cheng, Bennett Pang, Anthony Tang, Billy Lau and Michael Wong.

Plot
Five young and idealistic policemen, nicknamed Bravo (Mark Cheng), Rambo (Anthony Tang), Superstition (Bennett Pang), Wealthy (Michael Wong) and Old Bachelor (Billy Lau) are tired of their jobs and are determined to join the Special Duties Unit. Instructor Lee (Dean Shek) demands discipline, efficiency and obedience. Despite the hostility and hardships, the young officers begin to realize that Instructor Lee is passionate at heart. Eventually, they all respect him for his devotion and inspiration. During Christmas night, they are summoned to an emergency assignment. A dozen of innocent citizen are held as hostages. The death of Bravo in their first successful mission sadden their high spirit and celebrating mood.

Cast
Dean Shek as SDU Trainer Lee
Mark Cheng as Luk Ying-kei / Bravo
Bennett Pang as Ng Sam-kwai / Superstition
Anthony Tang as Rambo
Billy Lau as Old Bachelor
Michael Wong as Lee Ka-ho / Wealthy
Pat Ha as Siu-wai
Charine Chan as Chu-chu
Lee Heung-kam as Siu-wai's mom
Ku Feng as Siu-wai's dad
Tin Ching as SDU Assistant Trainer
Billy Chow as thug
Siu Yuk-lung as thug
So Hon-sang as thug
Ko Miu-si as Trainer Lee's wife
Wong Man as Assistant Trainer's wife
Law Keung as man at street fight
Stephen Chan as Ming
Bobby Wu
Yuen Ling-to
Yu Mo-lin as hostage
Sai Gwa-Pau as hostage
Leung Hak-shun
Fung King-chi
Patrick Tsui
Ho Leng-leng
Cheung Hing-choi
Ka Sang
Chiu Sze-wai
Ngan Yee-kei
Wong Chi-ying
Lam Foo-wai
Yat-poon Chai as Police Officer in parade
Luk Ying-hong as Inspector Law

Box office
The film grossed HK$7,375,915 at the Hong Kong box office during its theatrical run from 9 to 30 October 1985 in Hong Kong.

External links

City Hero at Hong Kong Cinemagic

1985 films
1980s action thriller films
1980s action comedy films
Hong Kong action thriller films
Hong Kong action comedy films
Police detective films
1980s Cantonese-language films
Films set in Hong Kong
Films shot in Hong Kong
1985 comedy films
1980s Hong Kong films